Pasithea  is a genus of herbs in the family Asphodelaceae, subfamily Hemerocallidoideae, first described as a genus in 1832. It contains only one known species, Pasithea caerulea, native to Peru and Chile in South America.

References

Hemerocallidoideae
Flora of South America